Nikola Kolev (born 6 June 1995) is a Bulgarian footballer who plays as a midfielder for Dunav Ruse.

Career

Youth career
Kolev started his career in Svetkavitsa. In 2007, he joined the Gillette youth academy and he was chosen by Hristo Stoichkov to join him for one year at the academy. After the one year with Vilafranca he chose to join the Bulgarian club Litex Lovech.

Litex Lovech
He became a champion with elite youth under-19 team of Litex for 2010-2011 season. In end of 2011 he joined in first team from the coach Hristo Stoichkov. Nikola Kolev made his first team debut for Litex Lovech against Levski Sofia on 29 March 2012 at age 16 years, 9 months and 23 days.

CSKA Sofia
In June 2016 he and big part of the Litex squad moved to CSKA Sofia.

Etar
On 6 September 2017, Kolev was loaned to Etar Veliko Tarnovo.  In June 2018, Kolev started pre-season training with his parent club put subsequently his loan was extended until the end of the year.

Club statistics

Club

References

External links
Profile at Sportal
Profile in UEFA

1995 births
Living people
Bulgarian footballers
Bulgaria youth international footballers
Bulgaria under-21 international footballers
First Professional Football League (Bulgaria) players
Second Professional Football League (Bulgaria) players
PFC Litex Lovech players
PFC CSKA Sofia players
SFC Etar Veliko Tarnovo players
Association football midfielders
People from Targovishte